William Stone (January 26, 1791February 18, 1853) was a U.S. Representative from Tennessee.

Biography
Born in Sevier County in the portion of the Southwest Territory that is now Tennessee, Stone completed preparatory studies. He married Mary Randall. They had seven children, three boys and four girls.

Career
About 1808, Stone and other members of his family moved by wagon train to Sequatchie County, Tennessee. He held several local offices. He owned slaves.

Stone was a captain in the Creek War and served with General Andrew Jackson in the Louisiana Campaign and was present at the Battle of New Orleans. He was presented a cane by Congress for bravery in the Battle of Tippecanoe, and was made brevet brigadier general for gallantry at the Battle of Horseshoe Bend.

An unsuccessful Whig candidate for election in 1836 to the Twenty-fifth Congress, Stone was subsequently elected to the Twenty-fifth Congress to fill the vacancy caused by the death of James Standifer and served from September 14, 1837, to March 3, 1839. He was an unsuccessful candidate for reelection to the Twenty-sixth Congress.

Death
Stone died in Delphi (later Davis), Sequatchie County, Tennessee, on February 18, 1853 (age 62 years, 23 days). He is interred at the family burying ground at Delphi.

References

External links
 

1791 births
1853 deaths
People from Sevier County, Tennessee
Whig Party members of the United States House of Representatives from Tennessee
American slave owners
United States Army officers
People of the Creek War
Military personnel from Tennessee